Labrun is a village and a former municipality in Wittenberg district in Saxony-Anhalt, Germany. Since 1 January 2011, it is part of the town Annaburg. The municipality belonged to the administrative municipality (Verwaltungsgemeinschaft) of Annaburg-Prettin from 1 January 2005 until 2011. Before, it had belonged to the administrative community of Heideck-Prettin.

Geography and transport
The community lies about 45 km southeast of Wittenberg and about 20 km north of Torgau in the lowlands on the east bank of the Elbe west of the Annaburg Heath, among Prettin, Bethau, Großtreben, Plössig and Groß Naundorf. This is, however, to a great extent a Bundeswehr troop drilling ground, and is therefore off limits. West of the community runs the Federal Highway (Bundesstraße) B 182, and to the north is the B 187. In the south, the community borders on Saxony.

History
Labrun is believed to have been founded in 1159 by Flemish migrants. They were settled in the area by the Archbishop of Magdeburg Wichmann von Seeburg and Albert the Bear.

References

External links
Elbe-Elster Tourism Association

Former municipalities in Saxony-Anhalt
Annaburg